Cyphokentia cerifera is a species of palm tree endemic to New Caledonia. It was previously placed the genus Moratia.

References

Clinospermatinae
Endemic flora of New Caledonia
Trees of New Caledonia
Conservation dependent plants
Taxonomy articles created by Polbot